Kibbles may refer to:
 dog food as in Kibbles 'n Bits
 cat food
 Kibble (disambiguation) (numerous meanings)